Pavo Urban (1 August 1968 – 6 December 1991) was a Croatian photographer, killed during the Croatian War of Independence.

Biography
He attended the Dubrovnik Maritime College. He started doing photographs in the high school, and was accepted in the photography department of the Academy of Dramatic Art of the University of Zagreb.

However, instead of attending the Academy he briefly joined the Croatian War of Independence as a volunteer fighting in Župa dubrovačka, and then he started photographing the Siege of Dubrovnik for the Dubrovacki Vjesnik, the Slobodna Dalmacija and the Croatian Ministry of Information, documenting the shelling and its consequences.

In the morning of 6 December 1991 he was deadly hit by a shell fragment while he was taking his last photographs.

The last photo of Pavo Urban, 6 December 1991. A moment later he was shot dead by shrapnels from Serbian and Montenegrin shelling. He was alone at that time of the bombing.

Heritage
Part of his work, including a series of 12 photos he took just before he was killed, his now part of the collection of the Museum of Modern Art in Dubrovnik. His photographs have been shown in several exhibitions.

See also
 List of journalists killed in Europe
 Gordan Lederer

References

External links
 
 

1958 births
1991 deaths
Croatian photographers
Civilians killed in the Croatian War of Independence
Journalists killed while covering the Yugoslav Wars
People from Dubrovnik